The 28th Independent Spirit Awards, honoring the best independent films of 2012, were presented on February 23, 2013. The nominations were announced on November 27, 2012. The ceremony was hosted by Andy Samberg.

Winners and nominees

{| class="wikitable"
!Best Feature
!Best Director
|-
| Silver Linings Playbook
 Beasts of the Southern Wild
 Bernie
 Keep the Lights On
 Moonrise Kingdom
| David O. Russell – Silver Linings Playbook
 Wes Anderson – Moonrise Kingdom
 Julia Loktev – The Loneliest Planet
 Ira Sachs – Keep the Lights On
 Benh Zeitlin – Beasts of the Southern Wild
|-
!Best Male Lead
!Best Female Lead
|-
| John Hawkes – The Sessions
 Jack Black – Bernie
 Bradley Cooper – Silver Linings Playbook
 Thure Lindhardt – Keep the Lights On
 Matthew McConaughey – Killer Joe
 Wendell Pierce – Four
| Jennifer Lawrence – Silver Linings Playbook
 Linda Cardellini – Return
 Emayatzy Corinealdi – Middle of Nowhere
 Quvenzhané Wallis – Beasts of the Southern Wild
 Mary Elizabeth Winstead – Smashed
|-
!Best Supporting Male
!Best Supporting Female
|-
| Matthew McConaughey – Magic Mike
 David Oyelowo – Middle of Nowhere
 Michael Peña – End of Watch
 Sam Rockwell – Seven Psychopaths
 Bruce Willis – Moonrise Kingdom
| Helen Hunt – The Sessions
 Rosemarie DeWitt – Your Sister's Sister
 Ann Dowd – Compliance
 Brit Marling – Sound of My Voice
 Lorraine Toussaint – Middle of Nowhere
|-
!Best Screenplay
!Best First Screenplay
|-
| David O. Russell – Silver Linings Playbook
 Wes Anderson and Roman Coppola – Moonrise Kingdom
 Zoe Kazan – Ruby Sparks
 Martin McDonagh – Seven Psychopaths
 Ira Sachs and Mauricio Zacharias – Keep the Lights On
| Derek Connolly – Safety Not Guaranteed
 Rama Burshtein – Fill the Void
 Christopher Ford – Robot & Frank
 Rashida Jones and Will McCormack – Celeste and Jesse Forever
 Jonathan Lisecki – Gayby
|-
!Best First Feature
!Best Documentary Feature
|-
| The Perks of Being a Wallflower
 Fill the Void
 Gimme the Loot
 Safety Not Guaranteed
 Sound of My Voice
| The Invisible War
 The Central Park Five
 How to Survive a Plague
 Marina Abramović: The Artist Is Present
 The Waiting Room
|-
!Best Cinematography
! Best International Film
|-
| Ben Richardson – Beasts of the Southern Wild
 Yoni Brook – Valley of Saints
 Lol Crawley – Here
 Roman Vasyanov – End of Watch
 Robert Yeoman – Moonrise Kingdom
| Amour • Austria / France / Germany Once Upon a Time in Anatolia • Bosnia and Herzegovina / Turkey
 Rust and Bone • Belgium / France
 Sister • France / Switzerland
 War Witch • Canada
|}

Films with multiple nominations and awards

Special awards

John Cassavetes AwardMiddle of Nowhere
 Breakfast with Curtis
 The Color Wheel
 Mosquita y Mari
 Starlet

Truer Than Fiction Award
Peter Nicks – The Waiting Room
 Lucien Castaing-Taylor and Véréna Paravel – Leviathan
 Jason Tippet and Elizabeth Mims – Only the Young

Piaget Producers Award
Mynette Louie – Stones in the Sun
 Derrick Tseng – Prince Avalanche
 Alicia Van Couvering – Nobody Walks

Someone to Watch Award
Adam Leon – Gimme the Loot
 David Fenster – Pincus
 Rebecca Thomas – Electrick Children

Robert Altman Award
 Starlet – Sean Baker, Julia Kim, Dree Hemingway, Besedka Johnson, Karren Karagulian, Stella Maeve, and James Ransone

Special Distinction Award
 Harris Savides

Find Your Audience Award
Laura Colella – Breakfast with Curtis
 Sara Lamm and Mary Wigmore – Birth Story: Ina May Gaskin and the Farm Midwives
 John Mitchell and Jeremy Kipp Walker – The History of Future Folk

References

External links
 2013 Awards at IMDb

2012
Independent Spirit Awards